Beinn Dearg Mhor  (731 m), is a mountain in the Red Cuillin mountains of the Isle of Skye. It is located between Loch Ainort and the settlement of Sligachan.

Beinn Dearg Mhor is the middle summit of the three big Red Hills near Sligachan, along with Marsco and Glamaig, the latter of which it is usually climbed in conjunction with. A fine, conical peak, its slopes are steep and covered in scree.

References

Grahams
Marilyns of Scotland
Mountains and hills of the Isle of Skye